Holy Sepulchre Cemetery is a Catholic cemetery owned by the Roman Catholic Archdiocese of Philadelphia and located in Cheltenham Township, Pennsylvania. It has a Philadelphia mailing address, 3301 West Cheltenham Avenue, Philadelphia, Pennsylvania, but the grounds are in Cheltenham Township, Montgomery County. It was established in 1894 and is managed by StonMor Partners.

The cemetery contains a large bronze statue of Christ created by J. Otto Schweizer in 1949.  The statue depicts Christ with his hands raised in a blessing and is named "Benediction".

Notable burials

 Stan Baumgartner (1894–1955), Major League Baseball pitcher
 Henry Burk (1850–1903), U.S. Congressman
 James J. Connolly (1881–1952), U.S. Congressman
 Michael Crescenz (1949–1968), Medal of Honor recipient, reinterred in Arlington National Cemetery
 Clare G. Fenerty (1895–1952), U.S. Congressman
 William J. Green Jr. (1910–1963), U.S. Congressman
 Bill Hallman (1867–1920), Major League Baseball player
 Bill Hewitt (1909–1947), professional football player
 Frank "Lefty" Hoerst (1917–2000), Major league baseball pitcher
 John B. Kelly Sr. (1889–1960), Olympic gold medalist in rowing, father of Grace Kelly
 John B. Kelly Jr. (1927–1985), Olympic bronze medalist in rowing
 Matt Kilroy (1866–1940), Major League Baseball pitcher
 Raymond Lederer (1938–2008), U.S. Congressman
 James R. Lloyd, Jr. (1950–1989), Pennsylvania State Senator
 James Washington Logue (1863–1925), U.S. Congressman
 Connie Mack (1862–1956), Hall of Fame baseball player and manager
 Billy Maharg (1881–1953), Major League Baseball player and professional boxer
 William McAleer (1838–1912), U.S. Congressman
 John J. McVeigh (1921–1944), Medal of Honor recipient
 Austin Meehan (1897–1961), Philadelphia politician
 Francis J. Myers (1901–1956), U.S. Congressman
 David Reilly (1971–2005), lead singer of the band God Lives Underwater
 Frank Rizzo (1920–1991), mayor of Philadelphia
 Joseph J. Scanlon (1924–1970), Pennsylvania State Senator
 Steve Yerkes (1888–1971), Major League Baseball player

See also
 Roman Catholic Archdiocese of Philadelphia
 Holy Cross Cemetery (Yeadon, Pennsylvania)

References

External links
 
 

1894 establishments in Pennsylvania
Cemeteries established in the 1890s
Cemeteries in Montgomery County, Pennsylvania
Cheltenham Township, Pennsylvania
Roman Catholic cemeteries in Pennsylvania